Below are the rosters for the 2009 South American Youth Championship tournament in Venezuela.

Players name marked in bold have been capped at full international level.

Argentina
Coach: Sergio Batista

Bolivia

Coach: Óscar Villegas

Brazil
Coach: Nélson Rodrigues

Chile
Coach: Ivo Basay

Colombia

Coach: José Hélmer Silva

Ecuador
Coach: Julio César Rosero

Paraguay
Coach: Adrián Coria

Peru

Coach: Héctor "Tito" Chumpitaz

Uruguay
Coach: Diego Aguirre

Venezuela

Coach: César Farías

References

South American U-20 Championship squads